Ibn Bazzaz was the author of the Safvat as-safa, a Persian hagiography of the Sufi shaykh Safi-ad-din Ardabili (died 1334), the eponymous founder of the Safavid Sufi order. The original name of the work was al-Mawahib al-saniyya fi l-manaqib al-Safaviyya.

According to an unpublished waqf (charitable endowment) from Ardabil dated September/October 1360, Ibn Bazzaz's full name was Rukn al-Din Tavakkuli ibn Shuja al-Din Ismail ibn Haji Mahmud. He belonged to a family of cloth and fabric sellers, thus his epithet "Ibn Bazzaz". Ibn Bazzaz was a follower of Safi-ad-din Ardabili, as well as the latters son and successor Sadr al-Din Musa (died 1377/78). Ibn Bazzaz received his education at Ardabil. Some of his own writings indicate that he studied Shafi'i jurisprudence and theology with a distinguished local religious scholar and Sufi preacher, named Shams al-Din Tavakulli Va'iz Ardabili.

References

Sources 
 
 

14th-century Iranian historians
14th-century Persian-language writers
Safaviyeh order